The Bartel BM 5, initially known as M.5 was a Polish biplane advanced trainer used from 1930 to 1939 by the Polish Air Force, manufactured in the Samolot factory in Poznań.

Design and development
The aircraft was designed by Ryszard Bartel in Samolot factory in Poznań, as an advanced trainer, transitory between primary trainers and bomber or reconnaissance aircraft.  Bartel had worked since 1926 on his BM-3 advanced trainer design, the preliminary design for which won a military contest, but in the meantime he developed a quite successful primary trainer Bartel BM-4 and then decided to model the advanced trainer upon that plane, to obtain better durability.  The result was the BM 5 design.  The BM 5 prototype was built in 1928 and flown on 27 July that year in Poznań. It had good handling, high stability and spin resistance, which made it a suitable trainer for larger aircraft.  A distinguishing feature of all Bartels was an upper wing of a shorter span, because lower and upper wing halves were interchangeable (i.e. the lower wingspan included the width of the fuselage).

The first prototype was designated BM 5a and was fitted with a  Austro-Daimler inline engine.  The second prototype, flown on  15 April 1929, was designated BM 5b and was fitted with a  SPA-6A inline engine, then was refitted in August with a  Hispano-Suiza 8Fb V-engine and redesignated BM 5c (it was meant to utilize engine stores from the Bristol F.2 Fighter).  Next 20 aircraft of each type were built: BM 5a, BM 5b and BM 5c.

A disadvantage of most BM 5s were old and faulty engines. From all the variants the BM 5a variant was the heaviest and had the worst performance. For that reason in 1935 one BM 5 was fitted at the PZL works with a  Wright Whirlwind J-5 radial engine, produced in Poland (in Polish Skoda Works, then Avia). This variant was designated the BM 5d and 20 of BM 5a and BM-5b were next converted to BM 5d.

Description
Wooden construction biplane. Fuselage rectangular in cross-section, plywood covered (engine section - aluminum covered). Rectangular two-spar wings, plywood and canvas covered. Crew of two, sitting in tandem in open cockpits, with individual windshields and twin controls, instructor in rear cockpit.  Fixed landing gear, with a rear skid. Engine in front, with a water radiator below fuselage nose (BM-4a,b,c). Two-blade wooden propeller. Fuel tanks in upper wings and fuselage, capacity: 235-270 L.

Operational history
BM 5s were used in the Polish Air Force for training from 1930, in a central pilots' school in Dęblin. Five BM 5c's were used in Naval Air Unit (MDLot) in Puck, but most were written off in the second half of 1930s and replaced with the PWS-26. Some survived until the German invasion of Poland in September 1939, but none survived the war.

Variants
BM 5a Austro-Daimler 6-cylinder straight engine, water-cooled,  nominal power
BM 5b SPA 6A 6-cylinder straight engine, water-cooled,  take-off power,  nominal power
BM 5c Hispano-Suiza 8Fb 8-cylinder V-engine, water-cooled,  take-off power,  nominal power
BM 5d Wright Whirlwind J-5 9-cylinder radial engine,  take-off power,  nominal power

Operators

Polish Air Force

Specifications(BM 5b SPA engine)

References

Bibliography

External links

Photos and drawings 
 Ugolok Neba site (in Russian)

BM 5
Biplanes
Single-engined tractor aircraft
1920s Polish military trainer aircraft